World Mosquito Day, observed annually on 20 August, is a commemoration of British doctor Sir Ronald Ross's discovery in 1897 that female anopheline mosquitoes transmit malaria between humans. Prior to the discovery of the transmitting organism, vector, there were few means for controlling the spread of the disease although the discovery of quinine in treatment had alleviated the problem of treatment. According to one survey, nearly half the world population was at significant risk from malaria in the 19th century with a 10% mortality among those infected. Ross had already conducted experiments with Culex (possibly C. fatigans) fed on birds infected with bird malaria Protesoma relictum (now Plasmodium relictum) in 1894 and noted that they developed in mosquito gut and had surmised that the same may happen in malaria. Ross had noted the day of the discovery made in Secunderabad (printed incorrectly as 1895, but definitely 1897 based on his postings). 

The London School of Hygiene & Tropical Medicine holds Mosquito Day celebrations every year, including events such as parties and exhibitions, a tradition dating back to as early as the 1930s.

See also 
World Malaria Day

References

External links 
 World Mosquito Day
 World Mosquito Day News
 World Mosquito Day - 2017

August observances
Insects in culture
Flies and humans